Phantom Town (later released in 2013 as Spooky Town on DVD) is a 1998 Canadian-American-Romanian horror fantasy Western film directed by Jeff Burr with the screenplay by Benjamin Carr. The film starred John Patrick White, Taylor Locke, Lauren Summers, Jim Metzler, Belinda Montgomery, and Gabriel Spahiu. The film focuses on Mike, a sixteen-year-old boy, and his two younger siblings as they search for their missing parents in the mysterious town of Long Hand, which according to maps does not exist at all.

The film had a runtime of 95 minutes. Phantom Town had an estimated budget of $800,000. The film was filmed at Castel Film Studios in Bucharest, Romania and was released in theaters in the US on July 1, 1998 and to VHS and DVD on February 16, 1999.

Plot 
Three children go on a search to find their parents who mysteriously disappeared after entering a town called Long Hand that isn't found on any map. The children check in at the town's hotel and begin to notice that the residents of Long Hand behave strangely, repeating the same actions over and over. Further exploration of the town leads the children to discover that the town is inhabited by body snatchers, and they could be the next victims. The children eventually find their parents in catacombs located underneath the town, and manage to leave the town with their parents after killing the monster that runs the town. In the end, Mike throws a party and the children discover that their parents had been transformed just like the other residents of Long Hand.

Cast 
 John Patrick White as Mike
 Taylor Locke as Arnie
 Lauren Summers as Cindy
 Jim Metzler as Dad
 Belinda Montgomery as Mom
 Gabriel Spahiu as Hotel Clerk
 Jimmy Herman as Attendant
 Jeff Burr as Uncle Jack
 Iuliana Ciugulea as Aunt Silvia

References

External links
 

1998 films
1990s English-language films
Canadian horror films
American horror films
Romanian horror films
English-language Canadian films
English-language Romanian films
1998 horror films
1998 fantasy films
1990s Western (genre) horror films
American Western (genre) horror films
Films shot in Bucharest
1990s American films
1990s Canadian films